The 49th Cannes Film Festival was held from 9 to 20 May 1996. The Palme d'Or went to Secrets & Lies by Mike Leigh.

The festival opened with Ridicule, directed by Patrice Leconte and closed with Flirting with Disaster, directed by David O. Russell. Sabine Azéma was the mistress of ceremonies.

Juries

Main competition
The following people were appointed as the Jury for the feature films of the 1996 Official Selection:
Francis Ford Coppola (United States) (president)
Nathalie Baye (France)
Greta Scacchi, actrice (Italy)
Michael Ballhaus (Germany)
Henry Chapier (France)
Atom Egoyan (Canada)
Eiko Ishioka (Japan)
Krzysztof Piesiewicz (Poland)
Antonio Tabucchi (Italy)
Anh Hung Tran (France)

Camera d'Or
The following people were appointed as the Jury of the 1996 Camera d'Or:
Françoise Fabian (Comedian)  President
Antoine Simkine (Fédération Nationale des Industries)
Daniel Schmid (Director)
Gian Luca Farinelli (Cinephile)
Jacques Kermabon (Critic)
Ramon Font (Critic)
Sandrine Gady (Cinephile)

Official selection

In competition – Feature film 
The following feature films competed for the Palme d'Or:

 Breaking the Waves by Lars von Trier
 Comment je me suis disputé... (ma vie sexuelle) by Arnaud Desplechin
 Crash by David Cronenberg
 Fargo by Joel Coen
 Feng yue by Chen Kaige
 Kansas City by Robert Altman
 Kauas pilvet karkaavat by Aki Kaurismäki
 La seconda volta by Mimmo Calopresti
 Le huitième jour by Jaco Van Dormael
 Les voleurs by André Téchiné
 Nan guo zai jian, nan guo by Hou Hsiao-hsien
 Tree of Blood by Flora Gomes
 Prea târziu by Lucian Pintilie
 Ridicule by Patrice Leconte
 Secrets & Lies by Mike Leigh
 Stealing Beauty by Bernardo Bertolucci
 The Quiet Room by Rolf de Heer
 The Sunchaser by Michael Cimino
 The Van by Stephen Frears
 Tierra by Julio Médem
 Trois vies & une seule mort by Raúl Ruiz
 Un héros très discret by Jacques Audiard

Un Certain Regard
The following films were selected for the competition of Un Certain Regard:

 Bastard Out of Carolina by Anjelica Huston
 Buenos Aires Vice Versa by Alejandro Agresti
 Compagna di viaggio by Peter Del Monte
 Conte d'été by Éric Rohmer
 Cwał by Krzysztof Zanussi
 Few of Us by Šarūnas Bartas
 Fourbi by Alain Tanner
 Gabbeh by Mohsen Makhmalbaf
 Haifa by Rashid Masharawi
 I Shot Andy Warhol by Mary Harron
 Irma Vep by Olivier Assayas
 La Bouche de Jean-Pierre by Lucile Hadžihalilović
 Looking for Richard by Al Pacino
 Love Serenade by Shirley Barrett
 Lulu by Srinivas Krishna
 Mossane by Safi Faye
 No Way to Forget by Richard Frankland
 Pasts by Laila Pakalniņa
 Pramis by Laila Pakalniņa
 Some Mother's Son by Terry George
 Sydney by Paul Thomas Anderson
 The Pallbearer by Matt Reeves
 The Pillow Book by Peter Greenaway
 The Waste Land by Deborah Warner
 Un samedi sur la terre by Diane Bertrand

Films out of competition
The following films were selected to be screened out of competition:

 Flirting with Disaster by David O. Russell
 Girl 6 by Spike Lee
 Il giorno della prima di Close Up by Nanni Moretti
 Le affinità elettive by Paolo Taviani, Vittorio Taviani
 Runaway Brain by Chris Bailey
 Microcosmos by Claude Nuridsany, Marie Perennou
 Trainspotting by Danny Boyle

Short film competition
The following short films competed for the Short Film Palme d'Or:

 4 maneras de tapar un hoyo by Guillermo Rendon Rodriguez, Jorge Villalobos de La Torre
 Attraction by Alexeï Diomine
 Brooms by Luke Cresswell, Steve Mcnicholas
 Estoria do gato e da lua by Pedro Miguel Serrazina
 Film Noir by Michael Liu
 Les fourmis rouges by Pierre Erwan Guillaume
 Oru Neenda Yathra by Murali Nair
 Passeio com Johnny Guitar by João César Monteiro
 Petite Sotte by Luc Otter
 Sin #8 by Barbara Heller
 Small Deaths by Lynne Ramsay
 Szél (Wind) by Marcell Iványi
 The Beach by Dorthe Scheffmann
 This Film Is a Dog by Jonathan Ogilvie

Parallel sections

International Critics' Week
The following films were screened for the 35th International Critics' Week (35e Semaine de la Critique):

Feature film competition

 Les Aveux de l’innocent by Jean-Pierre Améris (France)
 Yuri by Yoonho Yang (South Korea)
 Mi ultimo hombre by Tatiana Gaviola (Chile)
 The Empty Mirror by Barry J. Hershey (United States)
 The Daytrippers by Greg Mottola (United States)
 A Drifting Life by Lin Cheng-sheng (Taiwan)
 Not Me! (Sous sol) by Pierre Gang (Canada)

Short film competition

 Planet Man by Andrew Bancroft (New Zealand)
 A Summer Dress (Une robe d’été) by François Ozon (France)
 La Grande migration by Youri Tcherenkov (France)
 Le Réveil by Marc Henri Wajnberg (Belgium)
 The Slap by Tamara Hernandez (United States)
 La Tarde de un matrimonio de clase media by Fernando Javier León Rodríguez (Mexico)
 Derrière le bureau d’acajou by Johannes S. Nilsson (Sweden)

Directors' Fortnight
The following films were screened for the 1996 Directors' Fortnight (Quinzaine des Réalizateurs):

 A toute vitesse by Gaël Morel
 Beautiful Thing by Hettie MacDonald
 A Chef in Love by Nana Djordjadze
 Le Cri de la soie by Yvon Marciano
 Edipo Alcalde by Jorge Ali Triana
 Encore by Pascal Bonitzer
 Flame by Ingrid Sinclair
 Vaska Easoff (Haggyállógva, Vászka) by Peter Gothar
 Inside by Arthur Penn
 Youth Without God (Jeunesse sans Dieu) by Catherine Corsini
 Jude by Michael Winterbottom
 Kids Return by Takeshi Kitano
 Prisoner of the Mountains (Kavkazskiy plennik) by Sergei Bodrov
 La Promesse by Jean-Pierre Dardenne, Luc Dardenne
 Lone Star by John Sayles
 Macadam Tribu by José Laplaine
 Mondani a mondhatatlant: Elie Wiesel üzenete by Judit Elek
 Perfect Love (Parfait amour!) by Catherine Breillat
 Pasajes by Daniel Calparsoro
 Salut cousin ! by Merzak Allouache
 Select Hôtel by Laurent Bouhnik
 Trees Lounge by Steve Buscemi
 White Night (Layla Lavan) by Arnon Zadok
 Will It Snow for Christmas? (Y aura t’il de la neige à Noël ?) by Sandrine Veysset

Short films

 La Faim by Siegfried (18 min.)
 La Fille et l’amande by Bénédicte Brunet (15 min.)
 Vacances A Blériot by Bruno Bontzolakis (25 min.)
 Virage Nord by Sylvain Labrosse (15 min.)

Awards

Official awards
The following films and people received the 1996 Official selection awards:
Palme d'Or: Secrets & Lies by Mike Leigh
Grand Prize of the Jury: Breaking the Waves by Lars von Trier
Best Director: Joel Coen for Fargo
Best Screenplay: Un héros très discret by Jacques Audiard, Alain Le Henry
Best Actress: Brenda Blethyn for Secrets & Lies
Best Actor: Daniel Auteuil and Pascal Duquenne for Le huitième jour
Jury Special Prize: Crash by David Cronenberg
Golden Camera
Caméra d'Or: Love Serenade by Shirley Barrett
Short films
Short Film Palme d'Or: Szél by Marcell Iványi
 Jury Prize: Small Deaths by Lynne Ramsay

Independent awards
FIPRESCI Prizes
 Secrets & Lies by Mike Leigh (In competition)
 Prisoner of the Mountains (Kavkazskiy plennik) by Sergei Bodrov (Directors' Fortnight)
 The Mail (Pasts) & The Ferry (Pramis) by Laila Pakalnina (Un Certain Regard)
Commission Supérieure Technique
 Technical Grand Prize: The whole technical team for Microcosmos 
Ecumenical Jury
 Prize of the Ecumenical Jury: Secrets & Lies by Mike Leigh
 Ecumenical Jury – Special Mention: A Drifting Life (Chun hua meng lu) by Cheng-sheng Lin & Drifting Clouds (Kauas pilvet karkaavat) by Aki Kaurismäki
Award of the Youth
Foreign Film: White Night (Layla Lavan) by Arnon Zadok
French Film: Les aveux de l'innocent by Jean-Pierre Améris
Awards in the frame of International Critics' Week
Mercedes-Benz Award: Les aveux de l'innocent by Jean-Pierre Améris
Canal+ Award: Planet Man by Andrew Bancroft
Award the First Multimedia Day at the 49th Cannes Film festival
Best Cyber Poster Award in the First Multimedia Day at the 49th Cannes Film Festival in 1996: The Visionary by Beny Tchaicovsky

References

Media
INA: Opening of the 1996 Festival (commentary in French)
INA: List of winners of the 1996 festival (commentary in French)

External links

Cannes Film Festival Awards for 1996 at Internet Movie Database
 
 

Cannes Film Festival, 1996
Cannes Film Festival, 1996
Cannes Film Festival, 1996
Cannes Film Festival
Cannes